Glen Innes may refer to:

 Glen Innes, New South Wales, a town in Australia
 Glen Innes, New Zealand, a suburb of Auckland

See also

Innes (disambiguation)